Ait Seghrouchen Berber, or Seghroucheni (Seghrusheni), is a Zenati Berber language of the Eastern Middle Atlas Berber cluster. It is spoken by the Ait Seghrouchen tribe inhabiting east-central Morocco.

Classification
Ait Seghrouchen Berber is commonly classed as Central Atlas Tamazight. It is reported to be mutually intelligible with the neighbouring Berber dialect of Ait Ayache. Genetically, however, it belongs to the Zenati subgroup of Northern Berber, rather than to the Atlas subgroup to which the rest of Central Atlas Tamazight belongs, and are therefore excluded by some sources from Central Atlas Tamazight.

Ait Seghrouchen is part of the Eastern Middle Atlas Berber cluster of Zenati dialects, which is spoken in the eastern Middle Atlas.

Phonology

Consonants 
Ayt Seghrouchen is notable for having the lateral fricative  as an allophone of the sequence . /k, g/ are pronounced as stops, unlike the closely related Ayt Ayache dialect in which they are fricatives.

In the table below, when consonants appear in pairs, the one on the left is voiceless.

Vowels 
Ait Seghrouchen Berber has a typical phonemic three-vowel system, similarly to Classical Arabic:

These phonemes have numerous allophones, conditioned by the following environments:

(# denotes word boundary, X denotes C[−flat − −], C̣ denotes C[+flat], G denotes C, and )

Phonetic Schwa

There is a predictable non-phonemic vowel inserted into consonant clusters, realized as  before front consonants (e.g. ) and  before back consonants (e.g. . These are some of the rules governing the occurrence of :

(# denotes word boundary, L denotes , H denotes )

Stress
Word stress is non-contrastive and predictable — it falls on the last vowel in a word (including schwa).

References

Bibliography
 
 
 Bentolila, Fernand. (1981). Grammaire fonctionnelle d'un parler berbère. Aït Seghrouchen d'Oum Jeniba (Maroc). Paris: Société d'Études Linguistiques et anthropologiques de France (SELAF). ISBN: 2-85297-107-0.
 Destaing, Edmond. "Essai de classification des dialectes berbères du Maroc." Etudes et Documents Berbères, 19-20, 2001-2002 (1915)
 Kossmann, Maarten G. "Les verbes à i final en zénète"  
 Kossman, Maarten G. Essai sur la phonologie du proto-berbère. Koppe Verlag, 1999.
 Pellat, Charles. (1955). Textes berbères dans le parler des Aït Seghrouchen de la Moulouya. Paris: Larose.
 "Le Tamazight (Maroc central) – Tamaziɣt." 

Berber languages
Berbers in Morocco
Languages of Morocco